James Edward Clare (born 6 November 1959) is an English former professional footballer who played as a forward in the Football League.

References

1959 births
Living people
Footballers from Islington (district)
English footballers
Association football forwards
Chelsea F.C. players
Charlton Athletic F.C. players
English Football League players